Peter Hoare (born 17 October 1961 in Bradford, Yorkshire) is a British tenor, best known for his performances on the opera stage.

Career
Peter Hoare learned music initially as a percussionist, gaining a place at the Huddersfield School of Music in 1979 and then Goldsmiths, London, in 1982. After graduating from Goldsmiths in 1983, he taught percussion for Bedfordshire County Council and was Head of Performing Arts at Harrow College of Higher Education in 1986/87, and playing professionally with The Hallé and the Manchester Camerata. By then singing was beginning to take over his musical interests, and he soon joined Welsh National Opera.

Although he has performed many operas from the classical canon, he has made his name with his performances of 20th-century and contemporary opera.  His Metropolitan Opera debut was in Janáček's From the House of the Dead; he also played the Captain in the Met's Wozzeck, and he took the lead role in Schreker's opera Die Gezeichneten at the Komische Oper Berlin. He played Michel in Martinu's opera Julietta for English National Opera (ENO); and his roles in Britten's Peter Grimes and Billy Budd include both Bob Boles (La Scala) and Captain Vere, for Norwegian National Opera and Ballet (the opera's Norwegian premiere).  He was the talk-show host Larry King in the premiere of Mark-Anthony Turnage's Anna Nicole, and created the part of Mortimer in George Benjamin's Lessons in Love and Violence, both for the Royal Opera House. For the ENO, he sang Sharikov in Alexander Raskatov's A Dog's Heart.

As part of the First World War commemorations, Hoare premiered Torsten Rasch's A Foreign Field, based on English and German war poetry.

Recordings
Hoare has recorded several operas, including Lessons in Love and Violence, Káťa Kabanová and James MacMillan's The Sacrifice. He has also recorded Vaughan Williams' Fantasia on Christmas Carols and Delius' A Song of the High Hills.

References

External links
Opera Base biog on Peter Hoare
ROH biog on Peter Hoare
Interview with Peter Hoare by Dutch National Opera
Billy Budd: Behind the Scenes
Norwegian National Opera's Billy Budd

Living people
1961 births
Musicians from Bradford
English operatic tenors
Alumni of Goldsmiths, University of London